Ethel Esi Eshun popularly known as Queen eShun is a Ghanaian singer and songwriter known for hits like "Someone Loves Me", "Akyia", "Koti ma no", and "Fa Me Kor." "Fa Me Kor" is an Akan language which literally means "Take me away". eShun was made a Queen on 28 December 2019, at gomoa Afransi, in the central region by Ogyeedom Obrenu Kwesi Atta VI the paramount chief of gomoa afransi transitional area.
'

Early life and career
Prior to breaking into the Ghanaian music scene, she was a participant of Nigeria's Glo X-Factor where she won the first runner-up spot. She also took part in other two reality shows namely, MTN Project Fame and TV3 Mentor. In 2016, she launched an initiative, dubbed Eshun Healthcare Project in the Central Region of Ghana focused on quality healthcare delivery in Ghana. Eshun parted ways with Quophi Mens Label after her contract ended and founded a new management team called Eshun Music.

Performances 
 6th edition of the African legends Night 2017.

Awards and nominations

References 

Living people
1994 births
Ghanaian women singers
21st-century Ghanaian singers
People from Central Region (Ghana)